Frontotemporal dementia and parkinsonism linked to chromosome 17 (FTDP-17) is an autosomal dominant neurodegenerative tauopathy and Parkinson plus syndrome. FTDP-17 is caused by mutations in the MAPT (microtubule associated protein tau) gene located on the q arm of chromosome 17, and has three cardinal features: behavioral and personality changes, cognitive impairment, and motor symptoms. FTDP-17 was defined during the International Consensus Conference in Ann Arbor, Michigan, in 1996.

Signs and symptoms

Pathophysiology
The pathogenetic mechanisms underlying the disorder are thought to be related to the altered proportion of tau isoforms or to the ability of tau to bind microtubules and to promote microtubule assembly.

Diagnosis
Definitive diagnosis of FTDP-17 requires a combination of characteristic clinical and pathological features and molecular genetic analysis. Genetic counseling should be offered to affected and at-risk individuals; for most subtypes, penetrance is incomplete.

Management
Currently, treatment for FTDP-17 is only symptomatic and supportive.

Prognosis
The prognosis and rate of the diseases progression vary considerably among individual patients and genetic kindreds, ranging from life expectancies of several months to several years, and, in exceptional cases, as long as two decades.

Epidemiology
The prevalence and incidence remain unknown but FTDP-17 is an extremely rare condition. It is caused by mutations in the MAPT gene, which encodes a microtubule-binding protein. Over 100 families with 38 different mutations in the tau gene have been identified worldwide. The phenotype of FTDP-17 varies not only between families carrying different mutations but also between and within families carrying the same mutations.

References

Further reading
 Zbigniew K Wszolek, Yoshio Tsuboi, Bernardino Ghetti, Stuart Pickering-Brown, Yasuhiko Baba  and William P Cheshire Orphanet Journal of Rare Diseases 2006, 1:30

External links 

Neurodegenerative disorders
Brain disorders
Cognitive disorders
Genetic disorders with no OMIM